Alf Dupe (1 January 1876 – 14 April 1950) was an Australian rules footballer who played for the Geelong Football Club in the Victorian Football League (VFL).

Notes

External links 

1876 births
1950 deaths
Australian rules footballers from Victoria (Australia)
Geelong Football Club players